Jorge Eduardo Pickett Gutierrez (born February 6, 1942), professionally known as Eddie Gutierrez, is a Filipino actor and former matinee idol.

Early life
Gutierrez was born at 4:50 AM on February 6, 1942, at the Manila Doctors Hospital in Ermita, Manila. He is the son of Antonio Atayde Gutierrez, Jr. (August 5, 1913, in Santa Mesa, Manila – February 10, 1954, in Santa Mesa, Manila) and Mary Rufina Herranz Pickett (born November 24, 1916, in Tondo, Manila). His parents were married on April 14, 1939, in Santa Mesa, Manila.

His paternal grandfather was Antonio Maria Rogelio Gutierrez del Campo (September 16, 1866, in Santander, Spain – June 21, 1952, in Santa Mesa, Manila), while his maternal grandfather was John Thomas Pickett (February 17, 1868, in Ontario, Canada – March 8, 1939, in Manila).

Personal life
He married Annabelle Rama on November 8, 1980, with whom he has six children; Ruffa, Rocky, Elvis, Richard, Raymond and Ritchie Paul. His wife serves as the talent manager for his children who are in the entertainment industry.
He also had two children from previous relationships; Tonton Gutierrez with actress Liza Lorena in 1968 and Ramon Christopher Gutierrez with singer Pilita Corrales in 1971 who also known as "Asia's Queen of Songs" and grandmother of actress Janine Gutierrez daughter of Ramon Christopher Gutierrez. 
He has 14 grandchildren. 4 grandsons: Diego, David, Zion, and Kai; and 10 granddaughters: Janine, Jessica, Maxine, Lorin, Aneeza, Venice, Aneeka, Aria, Ezra, and Maia.

Career
A bit player in Prinsesang Gusgusin (1958), Gutierrez was introduced in Handsome (1959) and played the lead in films like Kaming Makasalanan (1960), Eddie Longlegs (1964), Portrait of My Love (1965) and Pogi (1967). He was under contract for Sampaguita Pictures for eight years. His other films include Hiram na Kamay (1962), June Bride (1962), Pitong puso (1962), Sabina (1963), Bird of Paradise (1963), Eddie Loves Susie (1964), Isinulat sa Dugo (1965), I'll Dream of You (1966), and All Over the World (1967).

After living in the United States for several years, he came back to the Philippines with his family and resumed his acting career. He appeared in Katawang lupa (1975), Ursula (1976), Beerhouse (1977), Bontoc (1977), Balatkayo (1978), Bomba Star (1980), Sari-saring ibong kulasisi (1978), Lagi na lamang ba akong babae? (1978), and Lumakad Ka, Gabi (1979).

In 1991, he was nominated Best Supporting Actor by the Film Academy of the Philippines (FAP) for Uubusin ko ang lahi mo (1991). He received the FAP award for Best Actor and the Filipino Academy of Movie Arts & Sciences (FAMAS) for Best Supporting Actor for Ikaw pa lang ang minahal (1992).

In 2004 and 2006, Gutiérrez joined the cast of the TV fantasy series, Mulawin and Majika in both series playing an elder with magical powers.

Filmography

Film

Television

References

External links

1942 births
Living people
20th-century Filipino male actors
Colegio de San Juan de Letran alumni
Filipino male child actors
Filipino male comedians
Filipino male film actors
Filipino people of Canadian descent
Filipino people of Spanish descent
Filipino Roman Catholics
Filipino television personalities
Eduardo
Male actors from Manila
People from Ermita
People from Santa Mesa
ABS-CBN personalities
GMA Network personalities
TV5 (Philippine TV network) personalities